USS S-5 (SS-110) was a "Government-type" S-class submarine of the United States Navy. Her keel was laid down on 4 December 1917 by the Portsmouth Navy Yard of Kittery, Maine. She was launched on 10 November 1919, sponsored by Mrs. Glenn S. Burrell, and commissioned on 6 March 1920 with Lieutenant Commander Charles M. "Savvy" Cooke, Jr., in command. She sank accidentally during full-power trials on 1 September 1920, but due to actions by her crew and the crews of other ships, there were no deaths. Refloated, she was lost when she sank again while under tow on 3 September 1920.

Loss

Sinking
At 13:00 on 1 September, she commenced a dive for a submerged test run. Water unexpectedly entered the submarine through the main air induction system, pouring into the control room, engine room, torpedo room, and motor room.

Normal procedure was to leave the main air induction valve open until the engines had a chance to come to a full stop, this operation being so timed as to occur just prior to complete submergence. In the case of S-5, however, the chief of the boat, Gunner's Mate Percy Fox, the man responsible for operating this valve, was momentarily distracted. Noticing the mistake, he grabbed the valve lever and jerked hard, causing the valve to jam open. After considerable difficulty, the system valves in the other compartments were closed, but all efforts to secure the torpedo room valve met with failure. The abandoned torpedo room flooded, making the boat bow-heavy. An additional  of water in the motor room bilges caused her to settle on the bottom. It was now impossible to eject water from the torpedo room. An attempt was then made to pump out the motor room, but a gasket blew out and there were no means for repair. Lying  on the bottom, the crew had little hope of being found, much less being rescued.

The crew reasoned that sufficient buoyancy in the after section could tilt the sub on her nose and extend the stern above the surface. The tilt would cause the water in the motor room to drain forward and increase buoyancy further. However, there was great risk involved because this would allow salt water into the battery room, which would generate deadly chlorine gas. They hoped to have enough time, after the water had entered, to close the watertight door before the gas could reach a dangerous level. After making preparations, air was applied to the after ballast and fuel tanks, blowing them dry. The stern began to rise and then shot to the surface. Men, floor plates, bilge water, and other loose objects fell through the length of the submarine. One man nearly drowned in the battery room, but was fished out, and the compartment door was sealed against the gas.

With inadequate tools, they took turns trying to cut a hole in the thick hull. After 36 hours, they had only succeeded in making a hole  in diameter.

Rescue
A seaman on watch aboard the wooden steamship Alanthus, making her last voyage, spotted what he thought was a buoy on 2 September 1920.  Knowing that no buoy should be so far out to sea, Alanthuss captain turned his vessel around to investigate. Approaching the submarine's stern rising above the ocean, the captain hailed S-5 in maritime fashion. That conversation became legend:

"What ship?"
"S-5."
"What nationality?"
"American."
"Where bound?"
"Hell by compass."

Alanthus could not help with the cutting, but was able to rig a pump to provide air, provide fresh water for drinking, and rig cables under S-5s stern to hold it above the surface. Alanthus had no radio, but at about 18:00 was able to contact the passing Panama Railroad Steamship Company steamer SS General G. W. Goethals using signal flags.

General G. W. Goethals, which was on voyage from Haiti to New York City, had a radio and contacted the U.S. Navy, and her crew immediately began enlarging the hole. By 01:45 on 3 September 1920, it was big enough to squirm through. At 03:00 on 3 September, Lieutenant Commander Cooke became the last member of S-5s crew to leave the submarine. Her crew had suffered no deaths or serious injuries.

Later that morning, the battleship  secured a towline to the stern of S-5 and proceeded to tow her to shallower water. The Navy began an unsuccessful attempt to raise S-5, but called it off in November 1920. A second effort in 1921 also was unsuccessful, and S-5 was struck from the Naval Vessel Register that year. She was the fourth submarine lost in U.S. Navy history.

Discovery of wreck

The exact location of the wreck of S-5 remained unknown until July 2001, when the Office of Ocean Exploration at the U.S. National Oceanic and Atmospheric Administration (NOAA) asked the NOAA survey ship  to search for it. Whiting, which had just completed a summer in port at Norfolk, Virginia, and was bound for Boston, Massachusetts, to conduct hydrographic survey operations in New England, paused off Cape May in late July 2001 to search for the wreck.

Whitings survey department approached the project as it would any typical hydrographic survey. Information on snags – obstructions on the ocean bottom that snarl fishing nets and gear – that local recreational fishermen had reported and reports of possible locations of the wreck from divers that had visited it provided Whiting with possible targets for her search. After her crew had prepared a plan for a systematic search, Whiting moved from target cluster to target cluster, mapping the ocean bottom using sidescan sonar. After eight hours of searching, Whiting found the wreck of S-5 directly over one of the suspected targets, made a sonar image of the wreck, and recorded its exact location. Whiting then made several more passes over the wreck to acquire additional images of it at various angles before leaving the scene.

Museum holdings and displays

The portion of S-5s hull plating that General G. W. Goethals removed to permit S-5s crew to escape from the submarine is on exhibit in the National Museum of the United States Navy in the Washington Navy Yard in Washington, D.C.

NOAA donated the sonar data NOAAS Whiting gathered in 2001 during her discovery of the wreck of S-5 to the Submarine Force Library and Museum in Groton, Connecticut, for archiving and display.

References

Hill, A.J. Under Pressure: The Final Voyage of Submarine S-Five. Free Press, 2002.

External links
On Eternal Patrol: USS S-5
The Search for the USS S-Five - NOAA
Navsource archive with multiple relevant pictures

United States S-class submarines
Lost submarines of the United States
Shipwrecks in the Atlantic Ocean
Ships built in Kittery, Maine
United States submarine accidents
1919 ships
Maritime incidents in 1920